Dendrosenecio elgonensis is one of the giant groundsel of East Africa; this one is endemic to Mount Elgon.  They used to be considered part of the genus Senecio but recently have been reclassified to their own genus, Dendrosenecio.

Description
Dendrosenecio elgonensis can grow to 7 meters tall, with a trunk to 30 centimeters in diameter and pith 2.5 to 3 centimeters in diameter.  D. elgonensis generally keeps its stem cloaked with its withered and decaying foliage (or with retained leaf-bases after fire) but eventually loses them as bark develops. "Periodic reproduction yields sparsely branched, spreading plants that rarely exceed five reproductive cycles."

Leaf surfaces are elliptic or heart-shaped, 97 centimeters long and 32 centimeters wide.  The lower portion of the leaves are hairless except for along the mid-vein.

Flower heads are presented horizontally. 11 to 13, 24 millimeter long ray florets and 40 to 70 disc florets.

Distribution
Found on the slopes of Mount Elgon between 2750 and 4200 meters.

Infraspecific name synonymy
The names for the giant groundsels have become somewhat confusing:
Dendrosenecio elgonensis (T.C.E.Fr.) E.B.Knox
Dendrosenecio elgonensis (T.C.E.Fr.) E.B.Knox subsp. barbatipes (Hedberg) E.B.Knox   
Dendrosenecio johnstonii (Oliv.) B.Nord. subsp. barbatipes (Hedberg) B.Nord.  
Senecio barbatipes Hedberg  
Senecio gardneri Cotton - non C.B.Clarke—nom. illegit. (ill.)  
Senecio gardneri Cotton var. ligulatus Cotton & Blakelock  
Senecio johnstonii Oliv. subsp. barbatipes (Hedberg) Mabb.  
Senecio johnstonii Oliv. var. ligulatus (Cotton & Blakelock) C.Jeffrey
Dendrosenecio elgonensis (T.C.E.Fr.) E.B.Knox subsp. elgonensis     
Dendrosenecio johnstonii (Oliv.) B.Nord. subsp. elgonensis (T.C.E.Fr.) B.Nord.  
Senecio amblyphyllus Cotton  
Senecio elgonensis T.C.E.Fr.  
Senecio johnstonii Oliv. var. elgonensis (T.C.E.Fr.) Mabb.

References

External links

elgonensis
Endemic flora of Kenya
Endemic flora of Uganda
Mount Elgon
Afromontane flora